The Chinese Ambassador to Ecuador is the official representative of the People's Republic of China to the Republic of Ecuador.

List of representatives

See also 
China–Ecuador relations

References 

Ambassadors of China to Ecuador
Ecuador
China